Kents Creek is a  long 2nd order tributary to the Banister River in Halifax County, Virginia.

Course 
Kents Creek rises in a pond about 1 mile southwest of Halifax, Virginia in Halifax County and then flows northeast to join the Banister River about 1 mile northwest of Halifax.

Watershed 
Kents Creek drains  of area, receives about 45.5 in/year of precipitation, has a wetness index of 366.83, and is about 69% forested.

See also 
 List of Virginia Rivers

References 

Rivers of Halifax County, Virginia
Rivers of Virginia